Shannon Sharpe (born June 26, 1968) is an American former professional football player who was a tight end in the National Football League (NFL) for 14 seasons, primarily with the Denver Broncos. Regarded as one of the greatest tight ends of all time, he ranks third in tight end receptions, receiving yards, and receiving touchdowns. He was also the first NFL tight end to amass over 10,000 receiving yards. He is the younger brother of former wide receiver Sterling Sharpe.

Sharpe played college football at Savannah State and was selected by the Broncos in the seventh round of the 1990 NFL Draft. During his 12 non-consecutive seasons with Denver, he was selected to seven consecutive Pro Bowls and four first-team All-Pros, and won two consecutive Super Bowl titles. In between his Broncos tenures, Sharpe was a member of Baltimore Ravens for two seasons, with whom he received an eighth Pro Bowl selection and won a third Super Bowl title. Sharpe retired as the NFL leader in receptions, receiving yards, and receiving touchdowns by a tight end. Following his retirement, Sharpe appeared as an analyst for The NFL Today on CBS Sports and co-hosts Skip and Shannon: Undisputed on Fox Sports 1 with Skip Bayless since 2016. He was inducted to the Pro Football Hall of Fame in 2011.

Early life and education
Sharpe, the younger brother of former NFL star wide receiver Sterling Sharpe, grew up in Glennville, Georgia, where he was an all-state player in three sports at Glennville High School. He once joked, "We were so poor, a robber once broke into our house and we ended up robbing the robber." He commented, "I was a terrible student. I didn't graduate magna cum laude, I graduated 'Thank you, Lawdy!'" At Savannah State, he played football and basketball, and also competed in track and field. In track, he competed in jumping and throwing events.

Sharpe was a three-time All-Southern Intercollegiate Athletic Conference selection from 1987 to 1989 and the SIAC Player of the Year in 1987. He was also selected as a Kodak Division II All-American in 1989. He led the Tigers' football team to their best records in the program's history: 7–3 in 1988 and 8–1 in 1989.  As a senior, Sharpe caught 61 passes for 1,312 yards and 18 touchdowns, including three games with more than 200 yards.  Sharpe finished his college career with 192 receptions for 3,744 yards and 40 touchdowns. He was inducted into the Division II Football Hall of Fame in 2009, Savannah State's athletic Hall of Fame in 2010, and the Black College Football Hall of Fame in 2013.

Professional career

Despite his stellar college career, Sharpe was not considered a highly rated prospect in the 1990 NFL Draft.  In addition to playing Division II college football, Sharpe's size (6'2", 230 pounds) was considered too large for a receiver and too small for a tight end.  He was eventually selected in the seventh round with the 192nd pick by the Denver Broncos.  After two mediocre seasons as a receiver in which he caught just 29 passes, Denver converted him to a tight end.  This quickly paid off, as Sharpe caught 53 passes in his third season. He remained with Denver until 1999, winning two championship rings at Super Bowl XXXII and Super Bowl XXXIII in the process. After the 1997 season championship – his first – he appeared on General Mills' Wheaties boxes with four other Broncos. After a two-year stint with the Baltimore Ravens, where he won another championship ring at Super Bowl XXXV, he returned to the Broncos. He played there until 2003. From there, he retired to become an NFL analyst for CBS.

Ozzie Newsome, the Ravens' general manager, said of Sharpe during his career: "I think he's a threat when he's on the field. He has to be double-teamed. He's a great route-runner. He's proven that he can make the big plays. That's what separates him. He's a threat." Sharpe was selected to the All-Pro Team four times, played in eight Pro Bowls (1992–1998, 2001) and amassed over 1,000 receiving yards in three different seasons. In a 1993 playoff game against the Los Angeles Raiders, Sharpe tied a postseason record with 13 receptions for 156 yards and a touchdown. In the Ravens' 2000 AFC title game against the Oakland Raiders, he caught a short pass on third down and 18 from his own four-yard line and took it 96 yards for a touchdown, the only touchdown the Ravens scored, en route to a 16–3 Ravens' win. Sharpe also caught a 50+ yard pass in each of their other two playoff games. He finished his 14-year career with 815 receptions for 10,060 yards and 62 touchdowns in 203 games.

NFL career statistics

Regular season

Postseason

Post-playing career
Sharpe was a commentator for the CBS Sports pregame show The NFL Today, including the Sprint Halftime Report and the Subway Postgame Show, replacing Deion Sanders and co-hosting with James Brown (formerly with Fox NFL Sunday), former NFL quarterbacks Dan Marino and Boomer Esiason, as well as former coach Bill Cowher. In the 2004 NFL regular season, Sharpe defeated Marino and Esiason in the pick 'em game of The NFL Today with a 53–21 record. His critics say that his broadcasting skills are hurt by his poor grammar and enunciation of words (Sharpe has a very noticeable lisp and drawl). A satirical article on The Onion joked "CBS Producers Ask Shannon Sharpe To Use at Least 3 Real Words Per Sentence." On February 18, 2014, it was announced that Sharpe, along with Dan Marino, were being relieved of their duties as on-air commentators on The NFL Today and were being replaced by Tony Gonzalez and Bart Scott.

In 2013, Sharpe became a columnist and spokesperson for FitnessRX For Men magazine and appeared on their September 2013 cover.

Sharpe has hosted Sirius NFL Radio's Opening Drive morning program, alongside Bob Papa.

Sharpe was among the 17 finalists being considered for enshrinement at the Pro Football Hall of Fame in 2009. However, he was passed over in his first year in a class that included Bruce Smith, Ralph Wilson, Derrick Thomas and Rod Woodson. On October 23, 2009, the NCAA Division II Football Hall of Fame announced that Sharpe would be inducted in December of that year. In addition, Savannah State University also retired Sharpe's No. 2 jersey.

On November 28, 2010, Sharpe was nominated as a semi-finalist for induction into the 2011 Pro Football Hall of Fame, along with Art Modell and 24 others, among them Jerome Bettis, Roger Craig, Marshall Faulk, and Deion Sanders. Subsequently, on February 6, 2011, Shannon Sharpe was inducted into the Pro Football Hall of Fame. Sharpe was escorted to the Hall of Fame ceremony by Canton native Haley Smith, continuing the tradition of pageant winners escorting the inductees.

After his retirement, Sharpe has been a social media staple, going viral for his antics and sports commentary. He is also notably a huge supporter of  NBA player LeBron James, referring to him as the greatest basketball player in NBA history. He also appeared on the American Dad! episode "The Scarlett Getter", portraying himself.

Sharpe joined Skip Bayless in FS1's sports debate show Skip and Shannon: Undisputed which premiered on September 6, 2016. In addition to his defense of LeBron James, Sharpe is also known for his criticism of Tom Brady and the Dallas Cowboys on the show.

Sharpe also has a podcast called Club Shay Shay. The episode of Club Shay Shay featuring Bubba Wallace was selected by the Apple Podcasts editorial team on their "Apple Podcasts Best of 2021" list. 

On the 10th February 2023 former NFL star Brett Favre is suing former NFL players Shannon Sharpe and Pat McAfee, as well as Mississippi Auditor Shad White, for making “defamatory charges” about the Packers legend’s involvement in a $77 million welfare fraud scheme.  A representative for Brett Favre, 53, stated that “Shannon Sharpe and Pat McAfee tried to enhance their careers by fabricating unsubstantiated defamation charges against Brett Favre.”

Hall of Fame tight end Sharpe, who played for the Ravens and Broncos, referred to Favre as a “sleazeball” on his FS1 show in September and charged the former quarterback with stealing $1.1 million in Mississippi welfare payments in return for lectures he never gave. Former Colts punter McAfee, who now runs a well-liked SiriusXM podcast, stated that Favre had “stolen from the underprivileged people of Mississippi.”

References

1968 births
Living people
10,000 receiving yards club
African-American players of American football
American columnists
American Conference Pro Bowl players
American football tight ends
American football wide receivers
American podcasters
Baltimore Ravens players
Denver Broncos players
Fox Sports 1 people
National Football League announcers
People from Glennville, Georgia
Players of American football from Chicago
Players of American football from Georgia (U.S. state)
Pro Football Hall of Fame inductees
Savannah State Tigers football players
Sportswriters from Georgia (U.S. state)
Sportswriters from Illinois